Chad Klassen (born April 16, 1985) is a Canadian ice hockey player. He is currently playing with Alba Volán Székesfehérvár in the Austrian Hockey League.

Amateur career
Klassen played five seasons of major junior hockey (2001 – 2006) in the Western Hockey League (WHL).<ref>http://whl.ca/roster/show/id/2823</ </ref> He went on to play five seasons of Canadian college hockey (2006 – 2011) with the University of Alberta in the CWUAA conference of Canadian Interuniversity Sport (CIS). For his outstanding college hockey play he was twice named to the CIS All-Canadian First Team (2008–09 and 2009–10) and was named the CIS (West) Most Valuable Player for the 2009–10 season.

Awards and honours

References

External links

1985 births
Living people
Fehérvár AV19 players
Canadian ice hockey centres
Idaho Steelheads (ECHL) players
Saskatoon Blades players
Spokane Chiefs players
Victoria Salmon Kings players
Canadian expatriate ice hockey players in Hungary